Strathmann is a German surname. Notable people with the surname include:

Ernst Strathmann, German sprint canoeist
Heine Strathmann, German sprint canoeist
Hermann Strathmann (1882–1966), German theologian and politician

See also
Strattmann

German-language surnames